2013 marked the completion of 100 years of Bollywood. It witnessed the release of multiple big-budget films in Bollywood including a number of sequels and quasi-sequels lined up. Some of the notable sequels were: Aashiqui 2, Dhoom 3, Grand Masti, Krrish 3, Murder 3, Once Upon a Time in Mumbaai 2, Race 2, Saheb, Biwi Aur Gangster Returns, Satya 2, Shootout at Wadala and Yamla Pagla Deewana 2.

The highest-grossing Indian film of 2013 is Dhoom 3, which emerged at the highest grossing Indian film ever.

Box office collection

January – March

April – June

July – September

October – December

See also
 List of Bollywood films of 2014
 List of Bollywood films of 2012

Notes

References

2013
Lists of 2013 films by country or language
2013 in Indian cinema